Ruben George McWilliams (12 June 1901 – 27 January 1984) was a New Zealand rugby union player. A loose forward, McWilliams represented  at a provincial level, and was a member of the New Zealand national side, the All Blacks, from 1928 to 1930. He played 27 matches for the All Blacks including 10 internationals, scoring 25 points (seven tries and two conversions) in all.

References

1901 births
1984 deaths
People from Paeroa
New Zealand rugby union players
New Zealand international rugby union players
Auckland rugby union players
Rugby union flankers
Rugby union players from Waikato